Lewis Run may refer to:

Lewis Run, Pennsylvania, a borough in McKean County, Pennsylvania
Lewis Run (Roaring Brook tributary), a stream in Luzerne County, Pennsylvania